Morchella semilibera, commonly called the half-free morel, is an edible species of fungus in the family Morchellaceae native to Europe and Asia.

DNA analysis has shown that the half-free morels, which appear nearly identical on a macroscopic scale, are a cryptic species complex, consisting of at least three geographically isolated species.  Because de Candolle originally described the species based on specimens from Europe, the scientific name M. semilibera should be restricted to the European species.  In 2012, Morchella populiphila was described from western North America, while Peck's 1903 species name Morchella punctipes was reaffirmed for eastern North American half-free morels.  M. semilibera and the other half-free morels are closely related to the black morels (M. elata and others).

A proposal has been made to conserve the name Morchella semilibera against several earlier synonyms, including Phallus crassipes, P. gigas and P. undosus. These names, sanctioned by Elias Magnus Fries, have since been shown to be the same species as M. semilibera.

References

External links

semilibera
Edible fungi
Fungi described in 1805
Fungi of Asia
Fungi of Europe
Taxa named by Augustin Pyramus de Candolle